The Crittenden County Bank and Trust Company is a historic bank building on the south side of Military Road in the center of Marion, Arkansas.  It is a single-story building, faced in painted limestone on the front facade and brick on the sides, with fluted Doric columns carrying a portico that spans the building's width.  Built in 1919, it has been home to a number of local banking institutions, and is a prominent local landmark, noted for its fine Classical Revival styling and its elegantly-appointed interior.

The building was listed on the National Register of Historic Places in 1984.

See also
National Register of Historic Places listings in Crittenden County, Arkansas

References

Bank buildings on the National Register of Historic Places in Arkansas
Neoclassical architecture in Arkansas
Buildings and structures completed in 1919
Buildings and structures in Marion, Arkansas
National Register of Historic Places in Crittenden County, Arkansas